Lisbon Station was a formation of the Royal Navy. It may also refer to:

 Lisbon Railroad Depot, a former railway station in Lisbon, New York, United States
 in Lisbon, Portugal:
 Cais do Sodré railway station
 Gare do Oriente
 Rossio railway station
 Santa Apolónia railway station
 a Lisbon Metro station